Mount White is a mountain in Antarctica, 3,470 m, standing  north-northwest of Mount Henry Lucy and forming the highest elevation in the Supporters Range. It was discovered by the Nimrod Expedition (1907–1909) and named for the Secretary of the expedition.

References

White, Mount
Dufek Coast